Giulia Gatto-Monticone (born 18 November 1987) is an Italian professional tennis player.

In February 2020, she reached her highest singles ranking of world No. 148, while her best WTA doubles ranking is 200, achieved in October 2014.

She has never lost a match in Fed Cup (2-0 record in double).

Personal life and background
Gatto-Monticone stated that her tennis idols are Roger Federer and Kimiko Date. Her favorite shot is her forehand and favorite surface to play on is grass.

Career highlights
Gatto-Monticone has won 11 singles titles and 25 doubles titles on the ITF Circuit.

In May 2019, she made her Grand Slam debut at Roland Garros.

In September 2020, Gatto-Monticone reached her first final on the WTA Challenger Tour. Partnering with Nadia Podoroska, she lost to Lidziya Marozava and Andreea Mitu, in straight sets.

Grand Slam singles performance timeline

WTA Challenger finals

Doubles: 1 (runner-up)

ITF Circuit finals

Singles: 30 (11 titles, 19 runner–ups)

Doubles: 38 (26 titles, 12 runner–ups)

Notes

References

External links
 
 

1987 births
Living people
Italian female tennis players
21st-century Italian women